Snatch Creek is a stream in the U.S. state of South Dakota.

Some say the creek received its name from an incident when a person was "snatched" out of the swollen creek, while others believe Indian women "snatched" out fish from the creek during low water.

See also
List of rivers of South Dakota

References

Rivers of Bon Homme County, South Dakota
Rivers of South Dakota